Ezra Danolds Cole (November 19, 1902 – August 8, 1992), of Nyack, New York, was well known stamp dealer who was named to the Hall of Fame of the American Philatelic Society.

Stamp dealer
Cole was known as a “world famous” stamp dealer as he helped build some of the most prestigious stamp collections known. He started selling stamps in the 1920s, and, by the 1930s, he had established his own business: Ezra Cole, Nyack, N.Y.

Philatelic activity
Cole was very involved in the organizational aspects of philately. He served as the president of the American Stamp Dealers Association, as a governor at the Collectors Club of New York, and as president of the Association for Stamp Exhibitions.

Honors and awards
In 1970 Cole received the Luff Award for Exceptional Contributions to Philately, and, in 1993, he was named to the American Philatelic Society Hall of Fame.

See also
 Stamp collecting

External links
 APS Hall of Fame - Ezra Danolds Cole

1902 births
1992 deaths
American stamp dealers
American philatelists
People from Nyack, New York
20th-century American businesspeople